Marin Vučemilović-Grgić (born February 3, 1987) is a Croatian footballer who plays as a midfielder with NK Uskok.

Club career

Early career 
Vučemilović-Grgić played in the Druga HNL with NK Solin for the 2008–09 season but had limited playing time due to an injury. He would re-sign with the club the following season. For the 2010–11 season, he continued playing in the Croatian second tier with NK Mosor.

Toronto Croatia 
In the summer of 2011, he played abroad in the Canadian Soccer League with Toronto Croatia. He recorded his first goal for Croats on July 22, 2011, against Brampton City United. In his debut season with Toronto, he assisted the club in securing a playoff berth by finishing second in the First Division. He contributed a goal in the preliminary rounds of the postseason against the Mississauga Eagles which helped the Croats advance to the next round. Toronto would win the CSL Championship after defeating Capital FC.

Vučemilović-Grgić would re-sign with Toronto for another season in 2012. In his sophomore season, he finished as the club's top goal scorer with 16 goals and was named the league's MVP. Throughout the regular season, he assisted the Croats in securing the First Division title. In the opening round of the playoffs, he recorded a goal against Niagara United which advanced the club to the next round. He made his second consecutive championship final appearance against Montreal Impact Academy where he recorded the winning goal, successfully securing Toronto's title.

In the summer of 2015, he returned to Toronto Croatia to play in the Croatian World Club Championship where he recorded a goal against Canberra Croatia FC to secure the bronze medal.

US Open Cup 
In May 2014, he played in the 2014 U.S. Open Cup with Chicago-based RWB Adria. He played in the opening round of the national tournament where Adria defeated Detroit City in a penalty shootout. Adria would ultimately reach the third round of the tournament where he played against Pittsburgh Riverhounds of the USL PRO. After a close match, Adria was eliminated after a 3–2 defeat.

London City  
After two seasons with Toronto Croatia, he signed a deal with league rivals London City for the 2013 season. In his debut season with London, he helped the club secure a playoff berth after a 12-year drought. He also finished as the club's top goal scorer with 19 goals. He played in the postseason semi-final against Kingston FC where he would score a goal however London was eliminated from the competition after a 4–2 loss.

He re-signed with London for the 2014 season. He finished the season as the league's top goal scorer with 20 goals and for the second time in his career was named the league's MVP. He returned to London for his third season where he briefly played the 2015 season before returning to Europe.

Croatia  
After a five-year stint abroad Vučemilović-Grgić returned to former club NK Solin for the 2015–16 season. The following season Solin was promoted from the third tier back into the Druga HNL and Vučemilović-Grgić was re-signed for the next season. Throughout his time in the second tier, he appeared in one match against NK Rudeš on August 28, 2016. He also made an appearance in the 2016–17 Croatian Football Cup against NK Zagora Unešić. 

In 2016, he returned to his former club Mosor where he played for a season. In 2018, he began to play with NK Uskok in the Croatian third tier. He served as the team captain for Uskok in 2019. He re-signed with Uskok in 2021 for his fifth season and continued as the team captain.

References

External links
 

1987 births
Living people
Footballers from Split, Croatia
Association football midfielders
Croatian footballers
NK Solin players
NK Mosor players
Toronto Croatia players
London City players
NK Uskok players
First Football League (Croatia) players
Second Football League (Croatia) players
Canadian Soccer League (1998–present) players
Croatian expatriate footballers
Expatriate soccer players in Canada
Croatian expatriate sportspeople in Canada